Lowe Alpine is a US outdoor equipment manufacturer founded in Utah in 1972 by brothers Mike, Greg and Jeff Lowe. Today it is owned by Rab.

History 
In 1967 Greg created a back pack, named the Expedition Pack, with internal phenolic resin laminate stays, later revised to 6061 aluminium flat bar, being a frame which facilitated the carrying of heavy loads and a unique chest strap designed to attach to a haul rope while still wearing the pack. This sturdy specially chest strap was changed to a chest-compression strap as well as the use of 6061 frame bars during the manufacturing period at High Touring, in Salt Lake City, Utah. In 1972 Mike borrowed $3,000 to register Lowe Alpine Systems as a manufacturing business.

The brand was sold to Rab in 2011, and in 2014 it was announced that Lowe Alpine would stop making clothing.

References

External links
 Official website
Equip Outdoor Technologies UK Ltd
A Short History of Lowe Alpine: 1934 - 2017

Climbing and mountaineering equipment companies
Outdoor clothing brands